The La Posada Historic District is a historic district in eastern Winslow, Arizona, United States, that is listed on the National Register of Historic Places (NRHP).

Description
The district is located at 200 East Second Street and dates from 1930.  It was listed as an  historic district on the NRHP March 31, 1992.

It includes the Winslow Santa Fe station as well as La Posada Hotel and Gardens, a Fred Harvey Company hotel designed by Mary Jane Colter in 1929 and restored in 1997 by artist Tina Mion and her husband Allan Affeldt. The hotel also includes a museum for Mion's art, opened in 2011.

The buildings in the historic district are of the Mission Revival and Spanish Colonial Revival architecture styles, and are listed for architectural criteria. The listing includes three contributing buildings, one contributing site and one other contributing structure.

See also

 National Register of Historic Places listings in Navajo County, Arizona
 Winslow (Amtrak station)

References

External links

Winslow, Arizona
Historic districts on the National Register of Historic Places in Arizona
National Register of Historic Places in Navajo County, Arizona
Atchison, Topeka and Santa Fe Railway hotels
Fred Harvey Company
History of Navajo County, Arizona
Mission Revival architecture in Arizona
Spanish Colonial Revival architecture in Arizona